The following is a timeline of the presidency of Donald Trump during the fourth and last quarter of 2018, from October 1 to December 31, 2018. To navigate among quarters, see timeline of the Donald Trump presidency.

Overview

Public opinion

Timeline

October 2018

November 2018

December 2018

See also
 Presidential transition of Donald Trump
 First 100 days of Donald Trump's presidency
 List of executive actions by Donald Trump
 List of presidential trips made by Donald Trump (international trips)

References

2018 Q4
Presidency of Donald Trump
October 2018 events in the United States
November 2018 events in the United States
December 2018 events in the United States
2018 timelines
Articles containing video clips
Political timelines of the 2010s by year